The King of the Mountain is an annual mountain climb race held in Pomona, in the Australian state of Queensland and organised by the Cooroy-Pomona Lions Club. Since its first formal race in 1959 following a bet in the Railway Hotel in 1958, the race has become a local holiday involving the district schools and a carnival like atmosphere.

Course

The original course was from the Railway Hotel (now demolished) to the top of Mount Cooroora and back. The 1979-2021 course went from the ANZ Bank to the top and back. The 2022-Present course is 1km longer but still starts from the old ANZ Bank building.

Established
In 1958, Bruce Samuels, a local footballer and railway porter in the town ran to the top of Mount Cooroora as a hangover cure. After being called out, a timed run was held on 22 March 1958 with Samuels completing the run in 40 minutes. In 1959, Brisbane local Barry Webb took up the challenge and completed it in 35:00. On 27 June 1959, the first formal race was held with Frank Mainwaring taking the title with a time of 31:51.

Inter-school challenge
As part of the festival, the inter-school relay is held on the morning of the race on the road surrounding Stan Topper Park. Some schools also partake in the inter-school tug-o-war competition.

The following schools participate:
 Cooran State School
 Cooroy State School
 Gympie South State School
 Pomona State School
 St Andrew's Anglican College

Main race winners
Bruce Samuels completed a timed run in 1958 to prove it was possible with a time of 35:00. Barry Webb was the first to take up the challenge in 1959 with a time of 40:00, shortly after that on 27 June 1959, Frank Mainwaring took the title in the first formal race involving 5 competitors.

Popular culture
Australian band, Midnight Oil, created a theme song for the event when in 1990 they released a single about the race by the same name, King of the Mountain. Although many people think the song is a reference to Peter Brock and the Bathurst 1000 held at Mount Panorama, drummer Rob Hirst confirmed the song is actually inspired by the footrace up Mount Cooroora and the surrounding natural beauty and unique history of the Noosa hinterland.

References

Sport in the Sunshine Coast, Queensland
Sports competitions in Queensland
Recurring sporting events established in 1959
Recurring sporting events established in 1979
Shire of Noosa